The 1967 Japan Series was the 18th edition of Nippon Professional Baseball's postseason championship series. It matched the Central League champion Yomiuri Giants against the Pacific League champion Hankyu Braves. The Giants defeated the Braves in six games to win their third consecutive championship.

Summary

See also
1967 World Series

References

Japan Series
Orix Buffaloes
Yomiuri Giants
Japan Series
Japan Series
Japan Series